Searching for the Elephant (lit. "Penthouse Elephant") is a 2009 South Korean psychological thriller written, directed and produced by S.K. Jhung (a.k.a. Jhung Seung-koo). It stars Jang Hyuk, Jo Dong-hyuk and Lee Sang-woo as three male friends who deal with sex addiction, anxiety and other contemporary disorders.

Plot
Freelance photographer Hyun-woo has a successful career and seems to be living an enviable life. But he's been suffering from depression since his ex-girlfriend Ma-ri left him, and begins to have trouble distinguishing between reality and delusion. One of Hyun-woo's friends, Min-seok, is an in-demand plastic surgeon who is also married to Hyun-woo's sister Soo-yeon. But Min-seok is constantly having affairs with various women and suspects that he may have sex addiction. Another longtime friend, Jin-hyuk, is a finance specialist. Jin-hyuk is secretly having an affair with Soo-yeon, Min-seok's wife, and is willing to give up everything for their love.

A suicidal, pot-smoking photographer with schizophrenic episodes, a sex addicted plastic surgeon with a bad conscience, and a secretive financier with legal trouble. These three childhood friends come together to relate common memories, future ambitions and share their deepest secrets. Searching for the Elephant is a raw, innovative film that portrays the decadent lives of the successful metropolitan in a cynical world. Materialistic dreams and mental anguishes collide as the lives of the three confused friends, and the women surrounding them, spirals out of control. The film is a stylistic psychological study, with its gritty story portrayed with creative images, disjointed cuts and a slick, stylistic camera work and aesthetics. Creating a beautiful contrast to the dark, disturbing story unfolding.

Cast
 Jang Hyuk ... Hyun-woo 
 Jo Dong-hyuk ... Min-seok 
 Lee Sang-woo ... Jin-hyuk 
 Lee Min-jung ... Soo-yeon 
 Hwang Woo-seul-hye ... Ma-ri
 Park Soo-jin ... Ji-na
 Byun Hee-bong ... zoo official
 Jeon Se-hong ... Mi-young
 Baek Jeong-min ... Dong-won
 Jang Ja-yeon ... Hye-mi
 Jung In-gi ... detective
 Lee Eun-soo ... young Hyun-woo 
 Yoon Seol-hee ... girl in school uniform
 Ra Mi-ran ... middle-aged teacher
 Woo Sang-jeon ... old man
 Park Jin-woo  ... chief administrator

Reception

Reviews for the film have been mixed. The Swiss website molodezhnaja.ch gave the film 3 stars (out of 5), citing the acting as "dramatic but exaggerated" but calling the film "boring." The online cinematheque MUBI gave it 4 stars (out of 5). Beyond Hollywood gave a generally negative review, stating that it is "void of any driving drama or tension right through until the final act" and that "the film is packed with wacky, often meaningless moments."

This film is S.K. Jhung's feature directorial debut, and it was screened at various international film festivals including the Stockholm International Film Festival, the Warsaw International Film Festival, the Leeds International Film Festival, and the São Paulo International Film Festival.

Searching for the Elephant landed on Korean critics' lists as one of the most underrated movies of 2009.

The writer director S. K. Jhung of Searching for the Elephant was nominated for Grand Prix at the Warsaw International Film Festival in 2009.

References

External links
  
 
 
 

South Korean erotic thriller films
2009 films
2009 thriller drama films
2000s erotic thriller films
2009 drama films
2000s South Korean films